Carrie Jones (born 4 September 2003) is a Welsh footballer who plays as a midfielder for English Women's Super League club Leicester City, on loan from Manchester United, and the Wales national team. She made her international debut for Wales at the age of 15 in 2019.

Early life
Jones was born on 4 September 2003 in Wales to Andrew and Joyce Jones. She grew up in Newtown, Powys and has an older sister, Maia, and a younger brother, Ioan. She attended Newtown High School.

Jones began playing football as a child at her grandmother's farm in Powys with her cousins and spent the majority of her youth career playing in local boys' teams. She joined her first youth side, Newtown White Stars, at the age of seven. She was forced to leave the club after a rule was introduced prohibiting girls from playing in a boys' team until they were 12 years old. This rule was eventually rescinded and Jones resumed playing in boys' sides. She later played for Berriew Junior Boys.

Club career

Cardiff City Ladies
Jones joined FA Women's National League South team Cardiff City Ladies for the 2019–20 season. She made nine league appearances for the team, scoring three goals.

Manchester United
In June 2020, it was announced Jones would be moving to Manchester United to join the club's full-time U21 FA WSL Academy team. Having been included in the two previous senior matchday squads as an unused substitute, she made her first-team debut on 7 March 2021 as an 88th minute substitute for Jessica Sigsworth in a 3–0 FA WSL win over Aston Villa.

On 19 November 2021 it was announced that Jones had signed her first professional contract with Manchester United until 2023 with the option of a further year.

Leicester City loan
On 21 July 2022, Jones joined fellow WSL side Leicester City on loan for the 2022–23 season.

International career
Having previously captained Wales at under-16 and under-17 levels, On 29 August 2019, Jones made her debut for the senior Wales national team as an 83rd minute substitute in place of Emma Jones during a 6–0 victory against Faroe Islands in the UEFA Women's Euro 2021 qualifying  at the age of 15 years and 359 days. At under 16 years of age, she was noted for making her senior international debut before she was eligible to play in a senior competitive match for her club. Jones had been called up to the senior squad the previous year as an experience building exercise but was ineligible to be selected due to her age. She made her first start on her second appearance, playing 77 minutes in a 1–0 friendly defeat to Scotland on 15 June 2021.

Style of play
Following Jones' international debut, former Wales player Gwennan Harries  described Jones as "So composed, got two great feet, but most importantly for me, her work ethic is outstanding, a real team player."

Career statistics

Club

International
Statistics accurate as of match played 15 February 2023.

International goals
 As of match played 12 November 2022. Wales score listed first, score column indicates score after each Jones goal.

References

External links 

2003 births
Living people
Wales women's international footballers
Women's association football midfielders
Welsh women's footballers
FA Women's National League players
Cardiff City Ladies F.C. players
Manchester United W.F.C. players
Leicester City W.F.C. players